European route E 806 is a European B class road in Portugal, connecting the cities Torres Novas – Guarda.

Route 
 
 Torres Novas
 Castelo Branco
 E801 Guarda

External links 
 UN Economic Commission for Europe: Overall Map of E-road Network (2007)
 International E-road network

International E-road network
Roads in Portugal